Tan Ya-ting (born 7 November 1993) is an archer who represents Chinese Taipei. She is a three-time Olympian, having participated at the 2010 Summer Youth Olympics and the 2012 and 2016 Summer Olympics. She has additionally competed in the World Archery Championships and the Archery World Cup.

Tan's first international medal came in the girls' individual event of the 2010 Summer Youth Olympics, earning silver medal after losing to former FITA Archery World Cup champion Kwak Ye-Ji in the final. She finished ninth overall in the women's individual event at the 2012 Summer Olympics, and won bronze medal in the women's team event four years later at the 2016 Summer Olympics. She was a member of the team that won Chinese Taipei's first recurve title at the 2019 World Archery Championships.

She has qualified for the 2020 Summer Olympics.

References

External links
 
 

1993 births
Living people
Archers at the 2010 Summer Youth Olympics
Archers at the 2012 Summer Olympics
Archers at the 2016 Summer Olympics
Olympic archers of Taiwan
People from Hsinchu
Taiwanese female archers
Archers at the 2010 Asian Games
Archers at the 2018 Asian Games
Asian Games medalists in archery
Asian Games silver medalists for Chinese Taipei
Medalists at the 2018 Asian Games
Medalists at the 2016 Summer Olympics
Olympic bronze medalists for Taiwan
Olympic medalists in archery
World Archery Championships medalists
Universiade medalists in archery
Universiade gold medalists for Chinese Taipei
Universiade silver medalists for Chinese Taipei
Medalists at the 2015 Summer Universiade
Medalists at the 2017 Summer Universiade
Archers at the 2020 Summer Olympics
21st-century Taiwanese women